Warsaw is an unincorporated community in Kaufman County, located in the U.S. state of Texas. According to the Handbook of Texas, the community had a population of 58 in 2000. It is located within the Dallas/Fort Worth Metroplex.

History
The area in what is known as Warsaw today was first settled sometime before 1840 and was originally called Warsaw Prairie. A post office was established at Warsaw in 1847 and remained in operation until 1858. The population of Warsaw was 15 in 1936 and had two businesses. It boomed to 58 residents from 1988 through 2000.

Geography

Education
Warsaw is served by the Crandall Independent School District, with elementary students attending W.A. Martin Elementary School in Crandall.

References

Unincorporated communities in Kaufman County, Texas
Unincorporated communities in Texas